State Highway 133 (abbreviated SH-133 or OK-133) is a short  state highway in central Oklahoma, United States. It has no lettered spur routes.

SH-133 was first established in the late 1950s. Originally commissioned with a gravel surface, it was paved in the 1970s.

Route description

History
SH-133 first appeared on the 1959 state highway map, implying it was commissioned in either late 1958 or early 1959. Originally, the route was entirely gravel-surfaced but by 1963 the Garvin County portion had been paved. The road was entirely paved in 1972.

Junction list

References

External links

SH-133 at OKHighways
SH-133 at Roadklahoma

133
Transportation in Garvin County, Oklahoma
Transportation in McClain County, Oklahoma